"Boom! Shake the Room" is a song by American hip hop duo DJ Jazzy Jeff & The Fresh Prince. The track samples the 1973 song "Funky Worm" by the Ohio Players. Released on July 16, 1993, as the second single from the duo's fifth studio album, Code Red, the single peaked at number 13 on the US Billboard Hot 100 and topped the charts of Australia, Ireland, Spain, and the United Kingdom.

Critical reception
Larry Flick from Billboard described "Boom! Shake the Room" as a "butt-shaggin' pop/hip-hop romp", adding that the "highly danceable jam has a shouted, air-punching chorus that should work well in a live environment." Troy J. Augusto from Cash Box stated that it "slams harder than any single this duo has so far produced", noting that the "groovin' track boasts sing-a-long chorus that'll make Hammer blush for sure". Dave Sholin from the Gavin Report wrote, "With the success Will Smith's had as The Fresh Prince Of Bel Air, he and Jazzy Jeff will probably do more than just "shake the room" at some stations. School is out for summer and the duo's latest has potential to light up those request lines."

Australian music channel Max included it in their list of "1000 Greatest Songs of All Time" in 2018. A reviewer from Music & Media said that "it looks like they're having a party on the border between hip hoponia and the land of swingbeat. Shake it, don't fake it!" James Hamilton from Music Weeks RM Dance Update deemed it a "Jump Around type ultra frenetic jaunty rap jiggler". Wendi Cermak from The Network Forty noted that "here we have a song that everyone who's anyone is talking about. Currently in heavy rotation in On The Tip, this jam has picked up over 300 plays in its first week!" Gavin Reeve from Smash Hits gave the song five out of five, describing it as "power rap". He added that it "will be exploding on turntables everywhere this summer."

Chart performance
"Boom! Shake the Room" proved to be successful on the charts on several continents. In Europe, the song topped the charts in the Republic of Ireland, Spain, and the UK. In the latter country, it peaked at the top of the UK Singles Chart on September 19, 1993 – for the week ending date September 25, 1993 – during its third week on the chart, becoming Smith's first and Townes' only chart-topping song in Britain. The song spent two weeks at the top. 
It also peaked within the top ten of the charts in Denmark, Germany, and Switzerland, as well as on the European Hot 100 Singles, where it peaked at number seven in October 1993. Additionally, it peaked within the top 20 of the charts in Austria, the Netherlands, and Sweden.

Outside of Europe, "Boom! Shake the Room" topped the charts in Australia, peaked within the top ten of the charts in New Zealand (number two), and number 13 on the Billboard Hot 100 in the duo's native United States. It earned a gold record in Germany and the United States, a silver record in the United Kingdom, and a platinum record in Australia and New Zealand.

Music video
A music video (directed by Scott Kalvert) was made to accompany the song.

Track listings

 UK CD1 "Boom! Shake the Room" (LP version) – 3:51
 "Boom! Shake the Room" (club radio mix) – 3:55
 "Boom! Shake the Room" (Street remix) – 4:30
 "Boom! Shake the Room" (Mr. Lee's club mix) – 5:02
 "Boom! Shake the Room" (Mr. Lee's extended club mix) – 5:55
 "Boom! Shake the Room" (LP instrumental) – 4:12
 "Boom! Shake the Room" (Street Remix Bonus Beats) – 4:17

 UK CD2 "Boom! Shake the Room" (LP version) - 3:51
 "Summertime" (7-inch mix) – 3:57
 "Parents Just Don't Understand" (single remix) – 2:59
 "Girls Ain't Nothing but Trouble" (shorter single edit) – 3:58

 Cassette single "Boom! Shake the Room" (LP version) – 3:51
 "Summertime" (7-inch mix) – 3:57

 European single "Boom! Shake the Room" (LP version) – 3:51
 "From Da South" – 3:14

 UK 1995 re-issue'''
 "Boom! Shake the Room" (Hula's tadio temix) – 3:35
 "Boom! Shake the Room" (LP version) – 3:51
 "Boom! Shake the Room" (Street remix) – 4:30
 "Boom! Shake the Room" (Hula's dub) – 5:31
 "Boom! Shake the Room" (Club radio mix) – 3:55
 "Boom! Shake the Room" (Mr. Lee's club mix) – 5:02
 "Boom! Shake the Room" (Hula's extended remix) – 6:09

Charts and certifications

Weekly charts

Year-end charts

Certifications

Release history

Cover versions
On July 2, 2010, Australian band Art vs. Science performed a version of Boom! Shake The Room live at the Splendour in the Grass festival, which was recorded by Triple J radio and released on the band's 2010 EP Magic Fountain.

On August 30, 2010, British metal band Sa-da-kO released a free download of their cover of the song. The band also performed the song live at Bloodstock Open Air Festival 2012.

From around 2012, British singer songwriter Dave McPherson of the band InME started performing a cover at his live shows.

British guitarist and singer songwriter MJ Hibbett has performed this regularly at live shows.

In 2013, British post-hardcore band The Blackout recorded a cover version as a bonus track on their fourth studio album Start the Party''.

References

1993 singles
1993 songs
DJ Jazzy Jeff & The Fresh Prince songs
Irish Singles Chart number-one singles
Jive Records singles
Music Week number-one dance singles
Number-one singles in Spain
Number-one singles in Australia
UK Singles Chart number-one singles